Gilbert Wilson may refer to:

Gilbert Livingston Wilson (1869–1930), ethnographer and Presbyterian minister
Gilbert Brown Wilson (1907–1991), American painter and muralist
Gilbert Wilson (bishop) (1918–1999), Bishop of Kilmore, Elphin and Ardagh, 1981–1993
Gilbert "Whip" Wilson (born 1947), member of the New Jersey General Assembly
Gilbert Wilson (banker), Governor of the Reserve Bank of New Zealand, 1962–1967
Gilbert Wilson (geologist), recipient of the 1968 Murchison Medal